OFK Borac (Montenegrin: Omladinski fudbalski klub Borac) is a Montenegrin football club based in Bijelo Polje. Founded in 2015, they are among youngest football clubs in country and currently are members of the Montenegrin Third League.

History
OFK Borac (OFC Fighter) was founded in 2015 and their debut season in the Montenegrin Third League was 2016–17. First success came during 2017, when OFK Borac played in the finals of the Northern Region Cup against FK Pljevlja (0-2). As a regional finalist, OFK Borac qualified for the Montenegrin Cup season 2017-18, but were eliminated in First Round against Second League side FK Igalo (0-3).

Honours and achievements
Northern Region Cup – 0
runners-up (1): 2017

Current squad 
During the Montenegrin Third League 2017–18 season, OFK Borac participated with following players: Mirza Ećo, Nihad Kadić, Mirnel Durović, Edis Ećo, Samir Fetić, Enis Kanalić, Ermin Popara, Dino Ljuca, Ermin Drndar, Asmir Pućurica, Alden Softić, Admir Ljuca, Nikola Kuč, Demir Mekić, Almedin Franca, Rade Korać, Emrah Bahović, Ernad Suljević, Marko Jovanović, Alden Ramović.

Stadium

OFK Borac plays their home games on Gradski stadion. There are two stands with overall capacity of 4,000 seats. At the north side of stadium is situated indoor sports hall 'Nikoljac'.

External links
Official Website

See also
Gradski Stadium (Bijelo Polje)
Bijelo Polje
Montenegrin Third League

References

Association football clubs established in 2015
Football clubs in Montenegro
Football clubs in Yugoslavia
2015 establishments in Montenegro
Bijelo Polje